Edison Mosquera Rebolledo (born 8 May 1990) is a Colombian professional footballer who plays as a midfielder for Viktoria Plzeň.

Club career
He arrived in Spain in 2007, initially on Mallorca. Mosquera played in the Copa del Rey for Alcoyano against Real Madrid in 2012, although his team lost 4–1. He played for CD Olímpic de Xàtiva in the 2013–14 season.

He joined Czech club Bohemians 1905 in 2014, becoming their first Colombian player. He scored his first league goal for Bohemians in August 2014, striking in a 3–2 away win against Příbram.

Statistics

Club performance

Statistics accurate as of last match played on 26 November 2016.

1 Includes cup competitions such as Copa Libertadores and Copa Sudamericana.

2 Includes Superliga Colombiana matches.

References

External links
 
 
 
 

1990 births
Living people
Footballers from Cali
Colombian footballers
Association football midfielders
Segunda División B players
Hércules CF B players
Villajoyosa CF footballers
CD Alcoyano footballers
CD Olímpic de Xàtiva footballers
Czech First League players
Bohemians 1905 players
Colombian expatriate footballers
Expatriate footballers in Spain
Expatriate footballers in the Czech Republic
Colombian expatriate sportspeople in Spain
Colombian expatriate sportspeople in the Czech Republic
FC Slovan Liberec players
Deportivo Cali footballers
Atlético Nacional footballers
FC Viktoria Plzeň players